The 2014 Fremantle Football Club season is the club's 20th season of senior competition in the Australian Football League (AFL).

Fremantle reached the finals for the third consecutive year, finishing the home and away season in the fourth position.  However, they lost both the qualifying final against Sydney and the semi-final against Port Adelaide to finish sixth overall.

Individually, Nat Fyfe won the Leigh Matthews Trophy, being voted the league's Most Valuable Player and his second consecutive Doig Medal, captain Matthew Pavlich became the first player from a Western Australian-based team to play 300 AFL games and three players, Fyfe, Aaron Sandilands and Hayden Ballantyne, were named in the 2014 All-Australian team.

Playing list
 Players are listed by jumper number. 2014 statistics are for AFL regular season and finals series matches during the 2014 AFL season only. Age is as the end of the season, 13 September 2014. Career statistics include a player's complete AFL career, which include games played for other AFL clubs. Statistics are correct as of the end of the 2014 season. Sources: Career and season

Additions to list

Removal from list

Results

Win/Loss table

Bold – Home game

Ladder

Awards and milestones

Club awards
The Doig Medal was awarded at a function at the Crown Perth on 15 November.  Between 1 and 5 votes are awarded to each player by five coaches after each game. Nat Fyfe won his second consecutive Doig Medal.  Paul Duffield and Ben Allan, the inaugural club captain, 2001 caretaker coach and board member since 2005 were both awarded life membership.

 Doig Medal: Nat Fyfe, 283 votes
 2nd: Aaron Sandilands, 251 votes
 3rd: Stephen Hill, 238 votes
 4th: David Mundy, 219 votes
 5th: Hayden Ballantyne, 209 votes
 6th: Michael Barlow, 205 votes
 6th: Cameron Sutcliffe, 198 votes
 9th: Lee Spurr, 193 votes
 9th: Danyle Pearce, 190 votes
 10th: Michael Johnson, 179 votes
 Best Clubman: Alex Silvagni
 Beacon Award: Matt Taberner 
 Player of the Finals: Cameron Sutcliffe & Zac Dawson

Milestones
 Round 7 - Aaron Sandilands (200 AFL games)
 Round 9 - Matthew Pavlich (300  AFL games and 600 AFL goals)
 Round 11 - Zac Dawson (50 Fremantle games) 
 Round 13 - Hayden Ballantyne (150  AFL goals)
 Round 15 - David Mundy (200  AFL games)
 Round 15 - Lee Spurr (50  AFL games)
 Round 16 - Hayden Ballantyne (100  AFL games)
 Round 18 - Paul Duffield (150  AFL games)
 Round 18 - Nick Suban (100  AFL games)
 Round 23 - Chris Mayne (150 AFL goals)
 Semi Final - Michael Walters (50  AFL games)

Debuts
 Round 13 - Colin Sylvia
 Round 16 - Michael Apeness
 Round 20 - Max Duffy

AFL Awards
 Leigh Matthews Trophy (Most Valuable Player at the AFL Players Association awards): Nat Fyfe
 2014 All-Australian team: Nat Fyfe, Aaron Sandilands and Hayden Ballantyne
 Ross Glendinning Medal:
 Round 7: Lachie Neale
 Round 15: Stephen Hill

AFL Award Nominations
 Round 1 - 2014 AFL Goal of the Year nomination and weekly winner - Hayden Ballantyne
 Round 9 - 2014 AFL Goal of the Year nomination and weekly winner - Hayden Ballantyne
 Round 9 - 2014 AFL Mark of the Year nomination and weekly winner - Nat Fyfe
 Round 18 - 2014 AFL Mark of the Year nomination and weekly winner - Lee Spurr
 Round 20 - 2014 AFL Mark of the Year nomination - Nat Fyfe
 Round 22 - 2014 AFL Rising Star nomination - Matt Taberner
 Round 23 - 2014 AFL Mark of the Year nomination and weekly winner - Zac Dawson

References

External links

Fremantle Football Club statistics at AFL Tables

Fremantle Football Club
Fremantle Football Club seasons
Fremantle Football Club